Red Sails to Capri is a children's historical novel by Ann Weil. It tells the story of the rediscovery of Capri's Blue Grotto in 1826.  The novel, illustrated by C. B. Falls, was first published in 1952 and was a Newbery Honor recipient in 1953.

See also

References

1952 American novels
Children's historical novels
American children's novels
Newbery Honor-winning works
Novels set in Italy
Capri, Campania
Fiction set in 1826
Novels set in the 1820s
Viking Press books
1952 children's books